The Celier Xenon 4 (also referred to by the manufacturer as the Xenon IV) is a Maltese autogyro designed by Raphael Celier and produced by Celier Aviation of Safi, Malta. The aircraft is supplied complete and ready-to-fly.

Design and development
The Xenon 4 is a development of the Celier Xenon 2 and Celier Xenon 3, with a newly designed fuselage and longer tailboom. It features a single main rotor, a two-seats-in side-by-side configuration enclosed cockpit, with some models offering a third seat. It has tricycle landing gear and a modified four cylinder, liquid and air-cooled, four stroke  turbocharged Rotax 912 engine in pusher configuration.

Variants

Xenon 4 Sport
Entry level civil model with two seats in side-by-side configuration.
Xenon 4 XL
Mid level civil model with three seats in 1-2 configuration.
Xenon 4 Executive
Top level civil model with three seats in 1-2 configuration.
Xenon 4 Geo
Civil model equipped for the land survey and aerial photography roles, intended for the construction, mining and survey industries.
C-22
Military model for medevac and other military roles; also referred to as the C-44.
C-22 VIP
Civil model for VIP transport.

Specifications (Xenon 4 Executive)

See also
List of rotorcraft

References

External links

X
Single-engined pusher autogyros
2010s Polish sport aircraft
Twin-boom aircraft